In mathematics, the Artin–Hasse exponential, introduced by , is the power series given by

Motivation

One motivation for considering this series to be analogous to the exponential function comes from infinite products. In the ring of formal power series Q[[x]] we have the identity

where μ(n) is the Möbius function.  This identity can be verified by showing the logarithmic derivative of the two sides are equal and that both sides have the same constant term.  In a similar way, one can verify a product expansion for the Artin–Hasse exponential:

So passing from a product over all n to a product over only n prime to p, which is a typical operation in p-adic analysis, leads from ex to Ep(x).

Properties 

The coefficients of Ep(x) are rational. We can use either formula for Ep(x) to prove that, unlike ex, all of its coefficients are p-integral; in other words, the denominators of the coefficients of Ep(x) are not divisible by p.  A first proof uses the definition of Ep(x) and Dwork's lemma, which says that a power series f(x) = 1 + ... with rational coefficients has p-integral coefficients if and only if f(xp)/f(x)p ≡ 1 mod pZp[[x]].  When  f(x) = Ep(x), we have f(xp)/f(x)p = e−px, whose constant term is 1 and all higher coefficients are in pZp.
A second proof comes from the infinite product for Ep(x): each exponent -μ(n)/n for n not divisible by p is a p-integral, and when a rational number a is p-integral all coefficients in the binomial expansion of (1 - xn)a are p-integral by p-adic continuity of the binomial coefficient polynomials t(t-1)...(t-k+1)/k! in t together with their obvious integrality when t is a nonnegative integer (a is a p-adic limit of nonnegative integers) . Thus each factor in the product of Ep(x) has p-integral coefficients, so Ep(x) itself has p-integral coefficients.

The (p-integral) series expansion has radius of convergence 1.

Combinatorial interpretation
The Artin–Hasse exponential is the generating function for the probability a uniformly randomly selected element of Sn (the symmetric group with n elements) has p-power order (the number of which is denoted by tp,n):

This gives a third proof that the coefficients of Ep(x) are p-integral, using the theorem of Frobenius that in a finite group of order divisible by d the number of elements of order dividing d is also divisible by d. Apply this theorem to the nth symmetric group with d equal to the highest power of p dividing n!.

More generally, for any topologically finitely generated profinite group G there is an identity

where H runs over open subgroups of G with finite index (there are finitely many of each index since G is topologically finitely generated) and aG,n is the number of continuous homomorphisms from G to Sn.  Two special cases are worth noting. (1) If G is the p-adic integers, it has exactly one open subgroup of each p-power index and a continuous homomorphism from G to Sn is essentially the same thing as choosing an element of p-power order in Sn, so we have recovered the above combinatorial interpretation of the Taylor coefficients in the Artin–Hasse exponential series. (2) If G is a finite group then the sum in the exponential is a finite sum running over all subgroups of G, and continuous homomorphisms from G to Sn are simply homomorphisms from G to Sn. The result in this case is due to Wohlfahrt (1977).  The special case when G is a finite cyclic group is due to Chowla, Herstein, and Scott (1952), and takes the form

where am,n is the number of solutions to gm = 1 in Sn.

David Roberts provided a natural combinatorial link between the Artin–Hasse exponential and the regular exponential in the spirit of the ergodic perspective (linking the p-adic and regular norms over the rationals) by showing that the Artin–Hasse exponential is also the generating function for the probability that an element of the symmetric group is unipotent in characteristic p, whereas the regular exponential is the probability that an element of the same group is unipotent in characteristic zero.

Conjectures

The problem is still open.

See also
Witt vector
Formal group

References

A course in p-adic analysis, by Alain M. Robert
 

Number theory